The Passion of Augustine is a Canadian drama film from Quebec, directed by Léa Pool and released in 2015. The film's cast also includes Anne-Élisabeth Bossé, Gilbert Sicotte, Marie Tifo, Danielle Fichaud, Lysandre Mémard and Andrée Lachapelle.

Plot
The film stars Céline Bonnier as Mother Superior Augustine, a Roman Catholic nun who teaches music in a convent school in rural Quebec in the 1960s and who is fighting to preserve her school against the backdrop of the social changes wrought by Vatican II and Quebec's Quiet Revolution.

Mother Superior Augustine's sister, deserted by her husband, leaves her rebellious musical daughter to be educated at Augustine's convent.  In addition to the changes to the Roman Catholic Church, Augustine faces the shutting down of her convent and attacks from the Mother General who feels Augustine is too much of an individual.

Accolades
For the 18th Quebec Cinema Awards (formerly known as the Prix Jutra), The Passion of Augustine won six awards, including Best Film.

References

External links
 

2015 films
2015 drama films
Canadian drama films
Films directed by Léa Pool
Films scored by François Dompierre
Films about Catholic nuns
Films about Catholicism
Films set in Quebec
Best Film Prix Iris winners
French-language Canadian films
2010s Canadian films